Hugo Weczerek (born 17 December 1909, date of death unknown) was an Austrian fencer. He competed in the team épée and sabre events at the 1936 Summer Olympics. He also represented Klagenfurter AC.

References

External links
 

1909 births
Year of death missing
Austrian male épée fencers
Olympic fencers of Austria
Fencers at the 1936 Summer Olympics
Austrian male sabre fencers